Remsen, New York is the name of two locations in Oneida County, New York, United States:

 Remsen (village), New York 
 Remsen (town), New York